Daniel Mašek (born 8 June 1969) is a retired Czech football midfielder.

References

1969 births
Living people
Czech footballers
FK Viktoria Žižkov players
FC Hradec Králové players
Czech First League players
Association football midfielders